Pete Lund is a political activist from the U.S. state of Michigan. In 2008, he was elected as a Republican to the Michigan State House of Representatives, taking office in 2009. He represented the 36th District, which is located in Macomb County and consists of the townships, or parts of the townships, of Bruce Township, Shelby Township, and Washington Township.

Biography
Lund received a B.A. in Economics and Political Science from Adrian College and an M.B.A. with an emphasis in Finance from Wayne State University. He is the former owner of Direct Mailers, and taught Public Finance part-time as an adjunct professor at Walsh College of Accountancy and Business.

Prior to his service as a state representative, Lund served as Macomb County Commissioner for eleven years.

In 2008, Lund defeated is general election opponent, Democrat Robert Murphy, 61% to 39% to win a seat in the Michigan State House of Representatives, representing District 36.

On November 14, 2008, Lund was selected to head the House Republican Campaign Review Task Force, a precursor to being selected as Chairman of the House Republican Campaign Committee.

Lund won reelection in 2010 and 2012, defeating Democrat Robert Murphy both times.

Lund served as State Representative until 2015, when he reached his term limit.

Since 2015, Lund has worked as the Michigan state director for Americans for Prosperity.

Lund resides in Shelby Township with his wife, Karen Potchynok-Lund. He has two daughters.

Results of 2008 general election

References

1964 births
Adrian College alumni
Living people
Republican Party members of the Michigan House of Representatives
People from Macomb County, Michigan
Wayne State University alumni
County commissioners in Michigan
21st-century American politicians
Politicians from Detroit